Carlos Angelo Santana (born 19 April 1988) is a Cuban professional boxer, fighting out of Miami, Florida, promoted by Don King.

Early life and amateur career
Santana was born the middle brother among the three sons of Pedro and Felicia Santana.  He is a member of a boxing family as his father and uncle are former national champions. Encouraged by his father, Santana started boxing at an early age, which led his father to turn into his amateur trainer. He was not allowed to travel abroad due to the fact that some of his family members are defectors to the United States. In order to reunite with his girlfriend Anay and achieve higher life standards, he sailed to Florida on a raft made of wood and tire inner tubes on a three-day journey in September 2007. After 10 days he arrived in the US where he met Don King who instantly became his promoter for professional boxing. He ended his amateur boxing career with a record of 180 wins and 3 losses.

Professional career
Four months after arriving in the US, he had his professional debut against Kenny Keaton in a potential 4-rounder in which he mismatched his opponent in the first round via TKO. He won his first 4 bouts with stoppers in initial rounds.

He moved his weight level up and had his first bout at 140 lbs (63.5 kg) and faced Ramzan Adaev from Russia for WBA Fedecaribe Light Welterweight title in Hard Rock Hotel and Casino, Las Vegas in which he got through via doctor stoppage TKO in round 2. This was the first pro-defeat for Adaev. Santana kept training along with Jorge Rubio at the Xtreme Gym in Hialeah, Miami. He has matched up Beninese Justin Savi on 23 June.

Professional boxing record

|-
|align="center" colspan=8|14 Wins (11 knockouts), 2 Losses (1 knockout), 0 Draws

|-
| align="center" style="border-style: none none solid solid; background: #e3e3e3"|Res.
| align="center" style="border-style: none none solid solid; background: #e3e3e3"|Record
| align="center" style="border-style: none none solid solid; background: #e3e3e3"|Opponent
| align="center" style="border-style: none none solid solid; background: #e3e3e3"|Type
| align="center" style="border-style: none none solid solid; background: #e3e3e3"|Rnd. Time
| align="center" style="border-style: none none solid solid; background: #e3e3e3"|Date
| align="center" style="border-style: none none solid solid; background: #e3e3e3"|Location
| align="center" style="border-style: none none solid solid; background: #e3e3e3"|Notes
|-align=center
|Loss
|14-2
|align=left| Hank Lundy	
|
|
|
|align=left|  Cleveland, Ohio, United States
|align=left|
|-align=center
|Loss
|14-1
|align=left| Bahodir Mamadjonov	
|
|
|
|align=left|  Las Vegas, Nevada, United States
|align=left|
|-align=center
|Win
|14-0
|align=left| Johnny Garcia	
|
|
|
|align=left|  Miami Jai Alai Fronton, United States
|align=left|
|-align=center
|Win
|13-0
|align=left| Justin Savi	
|
|
|
|align=left|  Las Vegas, Nevada, United States
|align=left|
|-align=center
|Win
|12-0
|align=left| Broderick Antoine	
|
|
|
|align=left|  Miami, Florida, United States
|align=left|
|-align=center
|Win
|11-0
|align=left| Ramzan Adaev	
|
|
|
|align=left|  Las Vegas, Nevada, United States
|align=left|
|-align=center
|Win
|10-0
|align=left| John David Charles	
|
|
|
|align=left|  Miami, Florida, United States
|align=left|
|-align=center
|Win
|9-0
|align=left| Darryl Watson	
|
|
|
|align=left|  Corbin, Kentucky, United States
|align=left|
|-align=center
|Win
|8-0
|align=left| Darien Ford	
|
|
|
|align=left|  Uncasville, Connecticut, United States
|align=left|
|-align=center
|Win
|7-0
|align=left| Miguel Gonzalez	
|
|
|
|align=left|  Las Vegas, Nevada, United States
|align=left|
|-align=center
|Win
|6-0
|align=left| Jaime Rodriguez	
|
|
|
|align=left|  Sunrise, Florida, United States
|align=left|
|-align=center
|Win
|5-0
|align=left| Mario Garcia Vargas	
|
|
|
|align=left|  Sunrise, Florida, United States
|align=left|
|-align=center
|Win
|4-0
|align=left| Anthony Woods	
|
|
|
|align=left|  Miami, Florida, United States
|align=left|
|-align=center
|Win
|3-0
|align=left| Alain Olivero	
|
|
|
|align=left|  Miami, Florida, United States
|align=left|
|-align=center
|Win
|2-0
|align=left| Rasool Shakoor	
|
|
|
|align=left|  Saint Louis, Missouri, United States
|align=left|
|-align=center
|Win
|1-0
|align=left| Kenny Keaton	
|
|
|
|align=left|  New York, New York, United States
|align=left|

References

External links
 Profile on Boxrec

1988 births
Living people
Welterweight boxers
Cuban male boxers
People from Pinar del Río Province
21st-century Cuban people